The Sultan Mehmed Fatih mosque of Krujë or Fethiye Mosque is an Ottoman-era mosque built before 1481 inside the Krujë Castle of Krujë, Durrës County, Albania. It is near the entrance of the Skanderbeg Museum.

History 
The Sultan Mehmed Fatih mosque was built before 1481 and named after the Turkish sultan Mehmed II (also called "the conqueror"). After being destroyed in 1831, the mosque got rebuilt for the local Albanian population under the reign of the sultan Mahmud II.

In 1917, the minaret of the Sultan Mehmed Fatih mosque, famed for its beauty, collapsed due to a storm. Until 1937, the mosque was used a house of worship for the Albanian Muslims. During the Second World War, the mosque was abused and ammunition was stored inside the mosque. The mosque again decayed during the time of the Communist dictator Enver Hoxha.

Today, of the Sultan Mehmed Fatih mosque, only the lower parts of the walls and the minaret remain.

Sources 

 Baki Dollma: Vende dhe ngjarje historike të Krujës e Kurbinit. „Dajti 2000", Tirana 2006, Kalaja e Krujës, S. 18–21.

Mosque
Mosques in Albania
Religious buildings and structures completed in 1481
Buildings and structures in Krujë
Tourist attractions in Durrës County
Mosques destroyed by communists